Opera is the debut studio album by Austrian duo Tosca. It combines new material and previously released singles, including "Chocolate Elvis". "Irresistibly funky" (BBC), "the blues, and the thick sultry bass, makes it as sexy and melancholy as cigarette smoke after a one-night stand in a strange city" (Mixmag). It is "one of the few sure things in a modest genre" (Sasha Frere-Jones, LA Weekly).

Track list

Fuck Dub, Pts. 1 & 2 – 8:55		
Amalienbad – 1:28			
Worksong – 6:00			
Gimmi Gimmi – 4:45		
Ladies + Gentlemen – 0:20			
Chocolate Elvis – 5:00		
Ambient Emely – 8:05			
Postgirl – 4:25			
Listen My Friend – 1:04			
Buona Sarah – 10:10	

All tracks written by Richard Dorfmeister and Rupert Huber.

References

External links
 http://www.toscamusic.com/discography/66-opera

1997 debut albums
Tosca (band) albums